Laura Kate Trevelyan (born 21 August 1968) is a British-American journalist who worked for the BBC for 30 years. She served as an On the Record reporter, United Nations correspondent (2006–2009) and New York correspondent (2009–2012), before anchoring BBC World News America (2012–2023).

Early life and education
Trevelyan was born in Islington, London, the oldest of three children. Educated at Parliament Hill School in North London, Trevelyan graduated with a first-class degree in Politics from Bristol University. Trevelyan gained a postgraduate diploma in Journalism from the Cardiff School of Journalism in 1991.

Career
Trevelyan began her career as a general reporter for London Newspaper Group in 1991, on titles including the Hammersmith Chronicle. She then joined Channel 4 as a researcher on A Week in Politics in 1992.

Trevelyan moved to the BBC in 1993, initially taking roles as a researcher for Breakfast News and as an assistant producer for Newsnight, before becoming a reporter for On the Record in 1994, where she covered the IRA ceasefire and Northern Ireland peace process. In 1998, Trevelyan shifted her focus to political reporting, covering Westminster, the 2001 general election and the run-up to the invasion of Iraq. She was a political correspondent for BBC News from 1999 and was based in London until her move to the US in 2004 to cover the presidential election, which coincided with her husband James Goldston’s move to the US, to become a Senior Producer at ABC News in New York, after he left his role at ITV as an executive producer.

From 2006 to 2009, Trevelyan covered the United Nations, travelling to Darfur, Congo, Burma and Sri Lanka and was the first journalist to interview Secretary General Ban Ki-moon. From 2009 to 2012, Trevelyan was a BBC correspondent based in New York, covering everything from the row over the proposed mosque at Ground Zero to Haiti's cholera epidemic.

After three years as the BBC's New York correspondent, Trevelyan joined BBC World News America as an anchor/correspondent.

Since joining WNA, Trevelyan has anchored live on location covering Hurricane Sandy, the Boston Marathon bombing, the Cleveland kidnapping rescue, the Oklahoma tornado, and President Obama's historic visit to Cuba.

Trevelyan is a member of the Council on Foreign Relations.

Grenada: Confronting the Past
Trevelyan's aristocratic relatives, including the Trevelyan baronets, owned more than 1,000 slaves across six sugar plantations on the Caribbean island Grenada in 17th and 18th centuries. On the abolition of slavery in 1834, slave owners in Britain were compensated by the government for the loss of their property; the Trevelyans received £34,000. Freed slaves had to work without pay for another eight years, and were not compensated. In the wake of a cancelled visit to Grenada by the Earl and Countess of Wessex in April 2022, Trevelyan described this as "rank unfairness fuelling calls for more than expressions of profound sorrow from the UK government and the royal family that slavery ever happened".

She made a documentary for the BBC World Service called Grenada: Confronting the past in 2022. In 2023, Trevelyan donated £100,000 in voluntary reparations to the people of Grenada.

In March 2023, Trevelyan announced she would be stepping down from her role at the BBC after "thirty incredible years" to become a full-time advocate. Acting BBC executive Paul Royall thanked her for her "outstanding" contributions to the BBC.

Books
Outside journalism, she has written the book A Very British Family: The Trevelyans and Their World, published in 2006, on the history of the Trevelyan family including her ancestor Sir Charles Trevelyan, 1st Baronet. Her second book, The Winchester: The Gun That Built An American Dynasty, explores the family behind America's most famous firearm and was released in September 2016.

Personal life
Trevelyan is married to James Goldston, former president of ABC News. They have three sons and live in New York. Live, on the BBC's coverage of the 2016 US Presidential Election, Trevelyan said she was about to become a US citizen; she was sworn in on 9 November, the day after Donald Trump won the presidential race.

References

External links
 

1968 births
Living people
Alumni of Cardiff University
Alumni of the University of Bristol
American people of Cornish descent
BBC newsreaders and journalists
BBC World News
British expatriates in the United States
British television journalists
English people of Cornish descent
Grenada–United Kingdom relations
People from Islington (district)
People with acquired American citizenship
Reparations for slavery